Stephen Fowler Wilson (September 4, 1821 – March 30, 1897) was an American lawyer, politician and judge from Pennsylvania who served as a Republican member of the U.S. House of Representatives for Pennsylvania's 18th congressional district from 1865 to 1869.  He also served as a member of the Pennsylvania State Senate for the 1st district from 1863 to 1865.

Early life and education
Wilson was born in Columbia Township, Pennsylvania the youngest of seven children born to George and Jane Wilson. He studied law under the Honorable James Lowrey and in 1845 was admitted to the Tioga County bar. He practiced law for almost 25 years.  He was originally a Democrat but switched to a Republican when that party was founded.  He held several local offices.

Career
He was a member of the Pennsylvania State Senate for the 1st district from 1863 to 1865 and served in one session after he had been elected a Representative to Congress.  He was a delegate to the 1864 Republican National Convention.

Wilson was elected as a Republican to the Thirty-ninth and Fortieth Congresses.  He was appointed additional judge of the fourth judicial district of Pennsylvania in 1871 to fill a vacancy.  He was elected additional judge and served ten years.  He was appointed associate justice of the supreme court of the Territory of New Mexico by President Chester A. Arthur on October 16, 1884.  He was president judge of the fourth judicial district of Pennsylvania from 1887 to 1889.  He resumed the practice of law in Wellsboro, Pennsylvania, where he died in 1897.  Interment in Wellsboro Cemetery in Wellsboro, Pennsylvania.

Notes

Sources

The Political Graveyard

|-

1821 births
1897 deaths
19th-century American politicians
New Mexico Territory judges
Pennsylvania lawyers
Pennsylvania state court judges
Republican Party Pennsylvania state senators
People from Bradford County, Pennsylvania
Republican Party members of the United States House of Representatives from Pennsylvania
19th-century American judges
19th-century American lawyers